Nescatunga is an unincorporated census-designated place (CDP) in Alfalfa County, Oklahoma, United States adjacent to Great Salt Plains State Park.  The population was 70 as of the 2010 census.

History
Sans Orielle, an Osage Indian, along with other members of his tribe guided Indian Agent Major George C. Sibley and his party from Fort Osage, Missouri, to the Great Salt Plains area of present-day Alfalfa county in 1811.  The Sibley party members are believed to have been the first white men to set sight on the salt plains, which Sibley called the Grand Saline.  The Salt Fork of the Arkansas River, flowing through the plains, was known by the Osages as Nescatunga - meaning 'big salt water'.

Nescatunga is adjacent to the Great Salt Plains Reservoir located on the Salt Fork of the Arkansas River.  The creation of the dam and reservoir was a U.S. Army Corps of Engineers’ project in the late 1930s and early 1940s.  It was completed in July, 1941 at a cost of $4.6 million.

Geography
Nescatunga is located in eastern Alfalfa County. It is near the outlet of the Great Salt Plains Lake on the Salt Fork of the Arkansas River and is adjacent to Great Salt Plains State Park. Oklahoma State Highway 38 runs through the center of the community, leading south  to Jet, the nearest incorporated town.

Demographics

See also
Great Salt Plains State Park and National Wildlife Refuge
Great Salt Plains

References

Census-designated places in Alfalfa County, Oklahoma
Census-designated places in Oklahoma